The 2011 Tour of Flanders cycle race was the 95th edition of this monumental classic and took place on 3 April. The race was won by Nick Nuyens ahead of Sylvain Chavanel and Fabian Cancellara.

Course

The 18 Ronde van Vlaanderen hills were:

General standings

References

Rvv.be - General standings

External links
Race website

Ronde van Vlaanderen
Ronde van Vlaanderen
2011